Stephen Blair Stanicek (born June 19, 1961) is a former Major League Baseball player. He played 13 games, twelve as a pinch hitter and one as a designated hitter.

Amateur career
Stanicek was drafted out of Rich East High School in Park Forest, Illinois in the 16th round of the 1979 MLB Draft by the St. Louis Cardinals. He opted to play collegiate baseball for the University of Nebraska. In 1981, he played collegiate summer baseball with the Wareham Gatemen of the Cape Cod Baseball League and was named a league all-star. He was selected in the first round of the 1982 MLB Draft by the San Francisco Giants.

Professional career
In a Sept. 16 game at Yankee Stadium, with the visiting Brewers trailing in the seventh inning, Steve Stanicek came to bat for the first time, pinch-hitting. He reached safely against Yankee pitcher Tommy John on an error, and Milwaukee rallied for three runs in the inning and a 5-4 victory.

Two nights later, Stanicek got his first big-league hit. He was a pinch-hitter again, this time in the ninth inning of a game at Tiger Stadium in Detroit that the Brewers were losing 7-1. After a two-run Dale Sveum home run, Stanicek was sent up against Willie Hernandez with a teammate on base and delivered a single. Next batter Paul Molitor hit a three-run homer to make it 7-6 and knock Hernandez out of the game, but that's how the game ended.

Personal life
Steve is the brother of fellow former major leaguer Pete Stanicek. The brothers made their Major League debuts 15 days apart in 1987. Stanicek has been a successful high school coach in the Chicago area and is currently head coach at Glenbrook South High School in Glenview, Illinois.

References

External links

Major League Baseball designated hitters
Milwaukee Brewers players
Philadelphia Phillies players
Fresno Giants players
Shreveport Captains players
El Paso Diablos players
Denver Zephyrs players
Scranton/Wilkes-Barre Red Barons players
Nebraska Cornhuskers baseball players
Wareham Gatemen players
Baseball players from Illinois
1961 births
Living people
American people of Polish descent
All-American college baseball players